National Highway 133, commonly called NH 133 is a national highway in  India. It is a spur road of National Highway 33. NH-133 traverses the states of Jharkhand and Bihar in India.

Route 
Bihar
Junction with NH-33 (near Pirpainti) - Jharkhand border.
Jharkhand
Bihar border - Godda - Choupa More on NH-114A.

Junctions  

  Terminal near Pirpainti.
  near Godda.
  Terminal near Chopa More.

Gallery

See also 
 List of National Highways in India
 List of National Highways in India by state

References

External links 

 NH 133 on OpenStreetMap

National highways in India
National Highways in Jharkhand
National Highways in Bihar